Archduchess Karoline Marie of Austria (5 September 1869, Altmünster, Upper Austria, Austria-Hungary – 12 May 1945, Budapest, Hungary) was a member of the House of Habsburg-Tuscany and Archduchess of Austria, Princess of Tuscany by birth. Through her marriage to Prince August Leopold of Saxe-Coburg and Gotha, Karoline was also a member of the Koháry branch of the House of Saxe-Coburg and Gotha. Karoline was the fourth child and second eldest daughter of Archduke Karl Salvator of Austria and his wife Princess Maria Immaculata of Bourbon-Two Sicilies. She was Princess-Abbess of the Theresian Royal and Imperial Ladies Chapter of the Castle of Prague (1893-1894).

Marriage and issue
Karoline married Prince August Leopold of Saxe-Coburg and Gotha, second eldest son of Prince Ludwig August of Saxe-Coburg and Gotha and his wife Princess Leopoldina of Brazil, on 30 May 1894 in Vienna. Karoline and August had eight children together:

 August Clemens (b. Pola, 27 October 1895 – d. Gerasdorf, 22 September 1908).
 Klementine Maria (b. Pola, 23 March 1897 – d. Lausanne, 7 January 1975), married on 17 November 1925 to Eduard von Heller.
 Maria Karoline (b. Pola, 10 January 1899 – d. Hartheim bei Linz, 6 June 1941). She had been living in an institution for mentally disabled people in Schladming, but was taken away and executed by gassing along with her fellow patients as a result of the Nazi eugenics policy, Action T4, in the concentration camp at Schloss Hartheim. As a great-granddaughter of Emperor Pedro II of Brazil, she is commemorated in the Holocaust memorial at Rio de Janeiro.
 Rainer (b. Pola, 4 May 1900 – d. after 7 January 1945 {believed to have been killed in action at Budapest}). Married twice and had issue by first marriage.
 Philipp (b. Walterskirchen, 18 August 1901 – d. 18 October 1985), married morganatically on 23 April 1944 to Sarah Aurelia Hálasz; their only son and their four grandchildren were barred from the succession of the House of Saxe-Coburg-Kohary.
 Theresia (b. Walterskirchen, 23 August 1902 – d. Villach, 24 January 1990), married on 6 October 1930 to Lamoral, Freiherr von Taxis di Bordogna e Valnigra (Their descendants bore the surname Tasso de Saxe-Coburgo e Bragança).
 Leopoldine Blanka (b. Schloß Gerasdorf, 13 May 1905 – d. Hungary, 24 December 1978).
 Ernst Franz (b. Gerasdorf, 25 February 1907 – d. Gröbming, Styria, 9 June 1978), married morganatically on 4 September 1939 to Irmgard Röll. This marriage was childless.

Ancestry

References

1869 births
1945 deaths
People from Altmünster
House of Habsburg-Lorraine
Austrian princesses
Princesses of Saxe-Coburg and Gotha